Rikard Nordraak (12 June 1842 – 20 March 1866) was a Norwegian composer. He is best known as the composer of the Norwegian national anthem, "Ja, vi elsker dette landet".

Biography
Rikard Nordraak was born and grew up in Oslo, Norway. His family came from the Nordråk farm in the district Land in the county of Oppland. His father was a brother of Inger Elise Nordraach, the mother of the Norwegian writer and poet, Bjørnstjerne Bjørnson.

Nordraak's musical gifts became evident at an early age, but as for many other artists at that time, a different career was already planned. He was going to pursue a career within business, and when he was fifteen he was sent to business school in Copenhagen. Nonetheless his musical interests prevailed and instead of studying business he ended up studying music, and in 1859 he went to Berlin for advanced studies. After six months he had to return home and he continued studies in Oslo, and his first compositions came during the winter of 1859–60. In 1861 he went back to Berlin to continue his studies, and he stayed there for two more years.

The compositions that he himself marked opus 1 were published in 1863, and contained six songs with texts  by his cousin Bjørnstjerne Bjørnson, amongst others. At this time Nordraak also composed Ja, vi elsker, which became the Norwegian national anthem. It was first performed publicly on 17 May 1864 in connection with the 50th anniversary of the Norwegian Constitution. The lyrics were written by Bjørnson between 1859 and 1868.

In 1864, he met Edvard Grieg in Copenhagen and inspired him with the idea of devoting his genius to Norwegian melody and the cultivation of a specifically national art. Nordraak later wrote incidental music for Bjørnson's plays  Maria Stuart i Skotland and Sigurd Slembe. He published his Fem norske Digte: Op. 2, consisting of songs and poems by Bjørnson and Jonas Lie. This was the last of his compositions that would be published during his lifetime.

In May 1865 he returned to Berlin to continue his education, but he was stricken with tuberculosis in October and died in Paris the following March, only 23 years old. He was buried in Kirchhof Jerusalem in the Berlin neighborhood of Kreuzberg (Friedhof IV der Gemeinde Jerusalem – und Neue Kirche). In 1925, Nordraak's coffin was brought home to Norway and buried in the Honor Grove at Vår Frelsers gravlund in Oslo.

Nordraak did not live long enough to produce much music. About forty compositions, mostly smaller works like songs, pieces for male choir and a few piano compositions, have been preserved. The biggest of these compositions, is the Scherzo Capriccio for piano solo, given the opus number 3, published posthumously by Edvard Grieg. This is a kind of rondo, using several features from Norwegian folk music; rhythms typical in slåtter, and dissonances typical for the hardingfele. However, the thematic material does not have this connection with folk music. Rikard Nordraak. Samlede verker, a critical edition of Nordraak overall compositions were published by Øyvind Anker and Olav Gurvin (1942).

With his passionate patriotism and great love for folk music, Nordraak's main contribution to Norwegian music history was to be an inspiration for contemporary composers, such as Grieg. When Grieg heard of Nordraak's death, he composed the Funeral March in Memory of Rikard Nordraak (Sørgemarsj over Rikard Nordraak). Part of his life story was dramatised in the musical Song of Norway.<ref>[http://www.classical-composers.org/comp/nordraak Rikard Nordraak']  Classical Composers Database  </ref>

Quotation

Nordraak himself explained his musical faith in this way:

References

Other sources
Grinde, Nils A History of Norwegian Music'' (University of Nebraska Press. 1991)

External links
 
 

1842 births
1866 deaths
19th-century classical composers
19th-century deaths from tuberculosis
19th-century Norwegian composers
Burials at the Cemetery of Our Saviour
Tuberculosis deaths in France
National anthem writers
Norwegian classical composers
Norwegian Romantic composers
Pupils of Theodor Kullak